Mac & Cheese 2 is the eleventh mixtape by Moroccan rapper French Montana, and the second installment to his "Mac & Cheese" series. It was released on May 6, 2010.
The mixtape features guest appearances from Wiz Khalifa, Big Sean, Max B, Nicki Minaj,  Chinx Drugz, Jadakiss, Nipsey Hussle, JAY Z, Curren$y, OJ Da Juiceman, Waka Flocka Flame, Bun B, and sample of Lady Gaga's "Speechless".

Track listing

Release history 

2010 mixtape albums
Sequel albums
French Montana albums